Irene N. Watts (born 1931) is a German-born Canadian writer and educator.

She was born in Berlin and lived there for seven years. She moved to the United Kingdom by way of Kindertransport and was educated in England and Wales. Watts earned degrees in English literature and modern history at Cardiff University. She married, had 4 children and taught elementary school. In 1968, she came with her family to Canada.

Career 
Irene taught at the Ermineskin reserve in Hobbema, Alberta for a year and then began directing plays for young audiences. In 1977, the family moved to Vancouver.

Watts served as head of Citadel on Wheels/Wings, an outreach program of the Edmonton Citadel Theatre, which visited schools and communities in northern Alberta and the Northwest Territories. In Halifax, she started the Young Neptune touring company and helped Tom Kerr establish the Neptune Theatre School. Watts was the founding director of the Vancouver International Children's Festival. In 2001, she was named a life member of the Playwrights Guild of Canada.

Her play Lillie, about Home Children in Canada, received first prize at the International Playwright's Forum of the International Theatre Institute. Watts has also received an Alberta Achievement Award for outstanding service to drama.

Selected works 

 Good-Bye Marianne (1998), received the Geoffrey Bilson Award, also adapted for the stage as a one act play
 Tapestry of Hope An anthology of Holocaust Writing for Young People (2003), compiled with Lillian Boraks-Nemetz, received the Yad Vashem award for Holocaust studies
 The Golem of Prague (2009)
 Munsch at Play, Eight stage Adaptations for Young performers (2010)
 Munsch at Play Act 2: Eight More Stage Adaptions (2010)
 No Moon, young adult novel (2010), finalist for the American Library Association Book of the Year, named one of the ten best young adult historical novels by Booklist magazine

References

External links 

 

1931 births
Living people
Canadian women dramatists and playwrights
Canadian writers of young adult literature
Writers from Vancouver
Jewish Canadian writers
Women writers of young adult literature
20th-century Canadian dramatists and playwrights
21st-century Canadian dramatists and playwrights
20th-century Canadian women writers
21st-century Canadian women writers